Bill Siekierski (born c. 1942) is a retired Canadian football player who played for the Ottawa Rough Riders. He played college football at University of Missouri.

References

Living people
1940s births
Canadian football tackles
Ottawa Rough Riders players
Missouri State Bears football players